Sir Christopher Kingston Howes  (born 30 January 1942) is a British Chartered Surveyor. A specialist in the study of land and buildings, with careers in the public, private, and academic sectors, he has worked in city planning, land use, and environmental management. 

After ten years as Director of Land and Property at the Department of the Environment, Howes was Chief Executive of the Crown Estate from 1989 to 2001. He was a member of the councils of the Duchy of Lancaster and the Duchy of Cornwall.

Early life
The younger son of Leonard Howes OBE and Marion Howes (née Bussey), he was educated at Gresham's School, Holt, and the University of London, where he graduated BSc in estate management in 1965. His father was Lord Mayor of Norwich for 1963–1964. He became an Associate of the Royal Institution of Chartered Surveyors in 1966 and graduated as a master of philosophy at the University of Reading in 1975.

Career
Howes's career has spanned the public and private sectors. In 1965 to 1967 he worked in the Valuation and Planning Department of the Greater London Council, then from 1967 to 1978 he was Steward and Honorary Surveyor to the Dean and Chapter of Norwich Cathedral. 
At the beginning of 1969 he joined the family firm of Percy Howes & Co., Surveyors and Valuers, of Cathedral Close, Norwich. Also becoming a member of Norwich City Council, by 1974 he was a Justice of the Peace for Norfolk. In Norwich he was a founding member of the Theatre Royal Trust, the Cotman Housing Association, and the Third World Centre.

From 1979 to 1989, Howes was Deputy Director of Land Economy and then Director of the Land and Property Division at the Department of the Environment. He was also a Visiting Professor at University College London from 1983 to 2001; Chairman of the World Land Policy Conference 1984, and the OECD's Urban Policy Group 1985.

From 1992 to 1999, Howes was a trustee of the Prince of Wales's Institute of Architecture; from 1995 to 1998 a Member of the Secretary of State for the Environment's Thames Advisory Board, and a Member of the Court of Advisers of St Paul's Cathedral.

From 1989 to 2001, he was the Second Commissioner and Chief Executive of the Crown Estate. This owns large area of Central London including Regent Street, over half of Britain's forests, hundreds of farms and other rural estates, and the whole of the British seabed between the coast and the twelve-mile international limit. In 2006, the annual income of the Crown Estate was around £200 million. He also served as a member of the Prince’s Council, the Duchy of Cornwall, and as a Council member of the Duchy of Lancaster.

From 2001 to 2017 Howes was an adviser to Barclays Capital and a member of the advisory board and Senior Adviser to Barclays Private Bank. He is a member of the Council of the Duchy of Cornwall; Deputy Chairman of Howard de Walden Estates; adviser to the Marcol Group; a member of the Investment Committee of St Paul's Cathedral; a board member of the British Architectural Trust; a trustee of the Suffolk Historic Churches Trust; a trustee of the Norfolk Archaeological Trust, and patron of the Heatherley School of Fine Art.

Career outline

1965 to 1967: The Greater London Council
1967 to 1979: Professional practice in Norwich and London
1979 to 1989: Director of Land and Property Division of the Department of the Environment 
1982 to 1989: Second Commissioner of the Crown Estate
1989 to 2000: Chief Executive of the Crown Estate 
1993 to 2005: Member of Council of the Duchy of Lancaster 
1998 to 2004: Non-executive director of the Norwich and Peterborough Building Society
2005 to 2007: Non-executive Chairman of the Barclays Bank Property Finance Team
1990 to 2011: Member of the Prince’s Council of the Duchy of Cornwall 
2001 to 2013: Member Advisory Board Barclays Private Bank
2001 to 2017: Advisor Barclays Property Finance Team
2001 to date: Director of the Howard de Walden Estate
2010 to date: Deputy Chairman of the Howard de Walden Estate
2002 to 2016: Director of the Colville Estate Ltd
2001 to 2016: Director of Compco PLC
2013 to 2017: Senior Adviser Barclays Wealth and Investment Management
2016 to date: Trustee Britten Pears Foundation
2018 to date: Director the Britten Estate Limited

Academic appointments

1975: Senior Visiting Fellow, School of Environmental Sciences, University of East Anglia
1976-1981: part-time lecturer, Department of Land Economy, the University of Cambridge
1974–1980: Visiting Lecturer, University of Reading
1982: Visiting Lecturer, University of Aberdeen 
1983: Visiting Lecturer, UCLA and USC
1984 to 2001: Visiting Professor, The Bartlett School of Architecture and Planning, University College London .
1985: Visiting Lecturer, Harvard University
1985: Visiting Lecturer, University of North Carolina Chapel Hill and University of Miami
1990 to date: Member of the Court of the University of East Anglia

Honours
 1993: Companion of the Order of the Bath
 1995: Honorary Fellow of the Royal Institute of British Architects
 1997: Commander of the Royal Victorian Order
 1999: Knight Commander of the Royal Victorian Order
 2000: Honorary DLitt degree, University of East Anglia
 2002: College of Estate Management Property Award

Publications
 Acquiring Office Space (1975) (joint author)
Value Maps: A Survey Into the Production and Use of Land and Property Value Maps (University of Reading Department of Land Management and Development, 1976)
 Value Maps: aspects of land and property values (Geo Books, 1979) 
Innovations in Urban Revitalization: Papers Presented to the World Congress on Land Policy, 1986 (Lincoln Institute of Land Policy, 1987)
 "Urban regeneration initiatives in England" in Land Development Studies, Vol. 5, No. 1, January 1988, pp. 57-65
 Economic Regeneration (monograph, 1988) 
 Urban Revitalization (monograph, 1988) 
 Papers in learned journals

References

External links
 Christopher Howes Pictures
 Christopher Howes news
 Duchy of Cornwall
 Institute of Continuing Professional Development
 Norwich & Peterborough Building Society

1942 births
Academics of University College London
Academics of the University of Aberdeen
Alumni of the University of London
Companions of the Order of the Bath
Councillors in Norfolk
Fellows of the Royal Institute of British Architects
Knights Commander of the Royal Victorian Order
Living people
People educated at Gresham's School
People associated with the University of East Anglia